Saline Area Schools is a school district headquartered in Liberty School in Saline, Michigan. The district serves Saline, Pittsfield Charter Township, and a portions of York Charter Township, Lodi Township and Saline Township .

High school

Saline High School (Grades 9-12) is located in Pittsfield Charter Township, just east of the City of Saline. It replaces the old high school which was approximately half its size. This building has 54 general classrooms, one-eight lane stretch pool, two gymnasiums (a 2,200-seat gymnasium, and an auxiliary gymnasium), a television studio, a 1,100-seat auditorium, and an extensive library.

Middle school

Saline Middle School (Grades 6-8) moved into the "old" High School on Maple Road for the 2006-2007 school year.  At , it is twice the size of Saline Liberty School which houses administrative offices and the Alternative High School.  This building can house up to 1,100 students, as well as the Senior Center which occupies one wing of the facility. It still has, even though slightly smaller than the Liberty School's, a woodshop. As well as the high school, the middle school has a small green screen room as an annex to the multimedia classroom where a group of the students produce the schools video announcements and school yearbook known as "The Hornet", affectionately named after the school districts mascot the "Saline Hornets".
Heritage (Grades 4-5)
Woodland Meadows (Grades K-3)
Harvest Elementary School (Grades K-3)
Pleasant Ridge (Grades K-3)
Houghton (Closed)

References

External links

 Saline Area Schools

Education in Washtenaw County, Michigan
School districts in Michigan